Leonardo Basso (born 25 December 1993) is an Italian cyclist, who currently rides for UCI WorldTeam .

Major results

2013
 7th Giro del Medio Brenta
2015
 1st Gran Premio Industria e Commercio Artigianato Carnaghese
 1st Trofeo Gavardo Tecmor
 5th Trofeo Alcide Degasperi
 10th Overall Tour of Hainan
 10th Trofeo Città di San Vendemiano
2017
 7th Trofeo Città di Brescia
2018
 1st Stage 1b (TTT) Settimana Internazionale di Coppi e Bartali
 5th Coppa Bernocchi
 7th Gran Premio Bruno Beghelli
 9th Trofeo Campos, Porreres, Felanitx, Ses Salines
 9th Trofeo Palma

References

External links

1993 births
Living people
Italian male cyclists
People from Castelfranco Veneto
Cyclists from the Province of Treviso